Liberto Corney Espallargas (20 February 1905 – 1955) was an Uruguayan boxer who competed in the 1924 Summer Olympics. He was born in Buenos Aires, Argentina. In 1924, he was eliminated in the first round of the lightweight class after losing his fight to Chris Graham of Canada.

References

External links
 profile

1905 births
1955 deaths
Boxers at the 1924 Summer Olympics
Lightweight boxers
Olympic boxers of Uruguay
Argentine emigrants to Uruguay
Boxers from Buenos Aires
Uruguayan male boxers